The second elections to the City and County of Swansea Council were held in May 1999. It was preceded by the 1995 election and followed by the 2004 election.

Overview
All council seats were up for election. These were the second elections held following local government reorganisation and the abolition of West Glamorgan County Council.

Boundaries 
There were some changes in ward boundaries for this election. The numbers of councillors changed in some wards, resulting in an overall increase in councillors to 72, as a result of The City and County of Swansea (Electoral Arrangements) Order 1998.

Candidates
The contests were fought by most of the main parties but Labour was the only one to contest the majority of seats.

|}

Results

* = sitting councillor in this ward prior to election

Bishopston (one seat)

Bonymaen (two seats)
The Independent candidate had captured the seat from Labour at a by-election.

Castle (four seats)
Possible boundary change. The number of seats increased from three to four. David Phillips had previously represented the Uplands ward.

Clydach (two seats)
Possible boundary change. The number of seats increased from one to two.

Cockett (four seats)
Dai Lloyd had won a seat from Labour at a by-election.

Cwmbwrla (three seats)
Possible boundary change. The number of seats increased from two to three.

Dunvant (two seats)
Possible boundary change. The number of seats increased from one to two. Labour had held the single seat ward in 1995.

Fairwood (one seat)
Elected as an Independent in 1995, John Bushell successfully defended the seat as a Conservative.

Gorseinon (one seat)
The former wards of Gorseinon Central and Gorseinon East were combined. Glyn Seabourne was councillor for Gorseinon East prior to this election.

Gower (one seat)

Gowerton (one seat)
The former wards of Gowerton East and Gowerton West were combined. Ronald Thomas was councillor for Gowerton East prior to this election.

Killay North (one seat)

Killay South (one seat)

Kingsbridge (one seat)
Possible boundary change. The number of seats reduced from two to one. Labour had held both seats in 1995.

Landore (two seats)

Llangyfelach (one seat)
Possible boundary change. The number of seats reduced from two to one. Independents had held both seats in 1995. Phil Downing had been elected for the now-abolished

Llansamlet (four seats)
Possible boundary change. The number of seats increased from three to four.

Lower Loughor (one seat)

Mawr (one seat)

Mayals(one seat)

Morriston (five seats)
Possible boundary change. The number of seats increased from four to five.

Mynyddbach (three seats)

Newton (one seat)

Oystermouth (one seat)

Penclawdd (one seat)

Penderry (three seats)
Possible boundary change. The number of seats reduced from four to three. Doreen Jones represented Mynyddbach from 1995 until 1999

Penllergaer (one seat)

Pennard (one seat)

Penyrheol (two seats)

Pontarddulais (two seats)
Boundary Change. The number of seats increased from one to two. John Miles represented the Talybont ward which was abolished.

Sketty (five seats)
Possible boundary change. The number of seats increased from four to five. June Stanton was elected as an Independent in 1995 but subsequently joined the Liberal Democrats.

St Thomas (two seats)

Townhill (three seats)
Possible boundary change. The number of seats increased from two to three.

Uplands (four seats)

Upper Loughor (two seats)
Possible boundary change. the number of seats was reduced from two to one

West Cross (two seats)
The Liberal Democrats won a by-election following the election of previous member Martin Caton as MP for Gower.

References

1999
1999 Welsh local elections
20th century in Swansea